The 2019–20 season is Independiente Rivadavia's 14th consecutive season in the second division of Argentine football. In addition to Primera B Nacional, the club are competing in the Copa Argentina.

The season generally covers the period from 1 July 2019 to 30 June 2020.

Review

Pre-season
Three players left Independiente Rivadavia before anyone came through the door, as Daniel Imperiale's departure to Ascenso MX side Cafetaleros de Chiapas on 5 June was followed by Nicolás Dematei (Agropecuario) and Federico Guerra (Tristán Suárez) agreeing moves away in the ten days following. Numerous loans from the previous campaign officially expired on and around 30 June. Sebastián Mayorga (Flandria), Rodrigo Ayala (Chacarita Juniors) and Franco Ledesma (Mitre) officially joined the club on 3 July. A fourth incoming was revealed on 4 July, as Julián Marcioni was loaned from Newell's Old Boys. Their first friendlies were played on 5 July, as they beat Deportivo Montecaseros 3–0 over two meetings. Emilio Porro and Sergio González signed on 8 July.

Independiente fell to defeat on 10 July in a friendly with lower league outfit Fray Luis Beltrán at Liceo Rugby Club, though responded with a 6–0 victory in the day's secondary encounter; which included a brace from Ignacio Irañeta and one from trialist Azarías Molina. Their third opponent of pre-season was San Martín (SJ), with the Primera B Nacional duo playing out back-to-back draws. Molina put pen to paper on 15 July, arriving from Belgrano. Colombian centre-back Jorge Zules Caicedo went to Alvarado on 18 July.

July
Independiente Rivadavia were eliminated from the Copa Argentina by Lanús on 20 July, falling at the round of thirty-two to a stoppage time goal from Marcelino Moreno. Gonzalo Klusener, from Agropecuario, became Independiente's eighth reinforcement on 25 July. Independiente made it three straight friendly draws on 27 July against Instituto, though won the secondary encounter after a strike from Matías Viguet.

August
Huracán Las Heras avoided defeat against Independiente on 3 August, firstly drawing 0–0 before taking the points off them via a Daian García goal. Independiente responded by going unbeaten in exhibition fixtures with Estudiantes (SL) on 9 August, with a 1–0 win preceding a 0–0 tie. Enzo Suraci and Abel Peralta penned terms to join from Primera División clubs on 13 August. Independiente lost 4–1 to Atlanta on the opening day of the 2019–20 Primera B Nacional, despite Gonzalo Klusener equalising on twelve minutes. Klusener scored again on matchday two, as Independiente secured a victory at home to Ferro Carril Oeste.

September
Independiente were defeated away from home for the second time in as many matches on 1 September, as Estudiantes (RC) beat them 3–1.

Squad

Transfers
Domestic transfer windows:3 July 2019 to 24 September 201920 January 2020 to 19 February 2020.

Transfers in

Transfers out

Loans in

Friendlies

Pre-season
Independiente Rivadavia met lower-league duo Deportivo Montecaseros and Fray Luis Beltrán in their opening friendlies. Their third opponents of pre-season were San Juan-based San Martín. They'd also host Instituto.

Competitions

Primera B Nacional

Results summary

Matches
The fixtures for the 2019–20 league season were announced on 1 August 2019, with a new format of split zones being introduced. Independiente Rivadavia were drawn in Zone A.

Copa Argentina

Independiente Rivadavia would face Lanús of the Primera División at Estadio Julio Humberto Grondona in Avellaneda on 20 July 2019, with Arsenal de Sarandí's stadium serving as a neutral venue for the fixture; as is usual in the competition.

Squad statistics

Appearances and goals

Statistics accurate as of 3 September 2019.

Goalscorers

Notes

References

Independiente Rivadavia seasons
Independiente Rivadavia